Thaisa Storchi Bergmann (born 19 December 1955) is a Brazilian astrophysicist working at the Federal University of Rio Grande do Sul in Porto Alegre, Brazil. She won the Women in Science Award in 2015 for her work on supermassive black holes.

Career
In 2004 she was one of the most cited Brazilian scientists.

In 2004 she edited, together with Drs. Luis C. Ho and H. R. Schmitt, the book The Interplay among Black Holes, Stars and ISM in Galactic Nuclei, proceedings of the 222nd Symposium of the International Astronomical Union.

In 2009 she joined the Brazilian Academy of Sciences.

In 2010, she edited, together with Drs. Bradley M. Peterson and Rachel S. Somerville, the book Co-evolution of Central Black Holes and Galaxies, proceedings of the 267th Symposium of the International Astronomical Union.

In 2011 she joined The World Academy of Sciences.

In 2015 she received the L'Oréal-UNESCO Awards for Women in Science for the Latin America region. The award cited her "outstanding work on super-massive black holes in the centers of galaxies and their associated regions of dense gas, dust, and young stars surrounding them, as well as their role in the evolution of galaxies."

In 2018, she received, from the Brazilian government, the National Medal of Scientific Merit (Medalha Nacional do Merito Cientifico).

In 2018, she has been nominated President of the Commission X1 of the International Astronomical Union, on Supermassive Black Holes, Feedback and Galaxy Evolution.

References

External links
http://www.if.ufrgs.br/~thaisa/

1955 births
People from Caxias do Sul
Brazilian astrophysicists
Living people
Academic staff of the Federal University of Rio Grande do Sul
Brazilian women scientists
Brazilian scientists
21st-century women scientists
Members of the Brazilian Academy of Sciences
L'Oréal-UNESCO Awards for Women in Science laureates